Ewa Klamt (born 26 May 1950, Straubing) is a German politician who served as a Member of the European Parliament for Lower Saxony from 1999 until 2009. She is a member of the conservative Christian Democratic Union, part of the European People's Party. From 2010 until 2013, she served as a member of the Bundestag, replacing Astrid Grotelüschen as representative of Delmenhorst – Wesermarsch – Oldenburg-Land.

References

1950 births
Living people
Christian Democratic Union of Germany MEPs
MEPs for Germany 2004–2009
MEPs for Germany 1999–2004
20th-century women MEPs for Germany
21st-century women MEPs for Germany
Members of the Bundestag for Lower Saxony
Female members of the Bundestag
People from Straubing
Members of the Bundestag 2009–2013
Members of the Bundestag for the Christian Democratic Union of Germany
Recipients of the Cross of the Order of Merit of the Federal Republic of Germany